Sheila Morag Clark Cameron  (born 22 March 1934) is a British lawyer. She was Dean of the Arches and Official Principal of the Arches Court of Canterbury from 2000 to 2009, and was therefore the senior ecclesiastical judge of the Church of England in that period. Since 1983 she has been Vicar-General of Canterbury . From 1985 to 1999 she was a Recorder.

Sheila is the daughter of Sir James Clark Cameron and Lady Irene M. Cameron, and was educated at the Commonweal Lodge School, Purley and St Hugh's College, Oxford where she graduated MA. She was called to the Bar by the Middle Temple in 1957. In 1960 she married fellow lawyer Gerard Charles Ryan and they had two sons. She has held various public offices, particularly in ecclesiastical law. She became QC in 1983 and a bencher of the Middle Temple in 1988. In 2002 she earned a Lambeth DCL and in 2004 was appointed a CBE.

Bibliography
Cameron, Sheila Morag Clark, (Mrs G. C. Ryan) (2008) Who's Who 2008, retrieved 17 July 2008

1934 births
21st-century English judges
English King's Counsel
People from Midhurst
Living people
Alumni of St Hugh's College, Oxford
People educated at Commonweal Lodge
20th-century English judges
Members of the Middle Temple
Commanders of the Order of the British Empire
English women judges